"Over & Over" is a song by German musician known under the pseudonym of Captain Hollywood Project, released in 1996 as the first single from his third album, The Afterparty (1996). Featuring vocals by singer Petra Spiegl, it peaked at number 13 in Finland, number 35 in Austria and number 45 in Germany.

Music video
The music video for "Over & Over" was directed by Frank Paul Husmann-Labusga.

Track listing

Charts

References

1996 songs
1996 singles
Blow Up singles
Captain Hollywood Project songs
English-language German songs
Music videos directed by Frank Paul Husmann